Ethmia hiemalis is a moth in the family Depressariidae. It was described by Aleksandr Sergeievich Danilevsky in 1969. It is found in Kazakhstan.

References

Moths described in 1969
hiemalis